Richard "Little Dick" West (December 31, 1860 – April 13, 1898) was an American outlaw of the Old West, and a member of Bill Doolin's gang.

Early life and background
West was born in Texas, supposedly in 1860. He was working as a cowboy on the Halsell Ranch in Oklahoma Territory when he first met Doolin, in 1892. He was with the gang during a bank robbery in Southwest City, Missouri, which resulted in a gunfight in which West was wounded. He remained with the gang through 1896, when Doolin was killed by a Deputy US Marshal Heck Thomas and Deputy Marshals Bill Tilghman. Thomas, and Deputy Marshals Bill Tilghman and Chris Madsen systematically eliminated the gang over the course of the 1890s, leading to their nickname, the Three Guardsmen.

Disappearance and death
After the gang split apart, they were still being pursued by the lawmen. West helped to form the Jennings Gang, with lawyers turned outlaws Al Jennings and his brother Frank, which made a number of bungled train robberies. After failing miserably, the gang split apart, and the other four members were captured and sentenced to jail in 1897, but West eluded capture. Deputy Marshal Madsen eventually tracked West to Guthrie, Oklahoma, where a shootout ensued, during which West was killed. He is buried there in the Summit View Cemetery. Other members of the Doolin Gang met similar fates in Oklahoma.

External links
Bill Doolin
"Little Dick" West
Jennings Gang

1860 births
1898 deaths
American bank robbers
Cowboys
Deaths by firearm in Oklahoma
Fugitives
Gunslingers of the American Old West
Outlaws of the American Old West
People of Indian Territory
People from Texas
People shot dead by law enforcement officers in the United States